Sunstroke plants or heliophytes  are adapted to a habitat with a very intensive insolation, because of the construction of its own structure and maintenance (metabolism). Solar plants, for example, are mullein, ling, thyme and soft velcro, white clover, and most roses. They are common in open terrain, rocks, meadows, as well as at the mountain pastures and grasslands and other long sunny exposures.

Special features of the plant include coarse tiny leaves with hairy and waxy protection against excessive light radiation and water loss. In structure, the leaves vary in frequent double palisade layers. Chloroplasts have a protective element such as carotenoid and the enzymes, and accumulation of ROS to avoid toxic effects. In addition, there are also  stoma tal apparatus on the leaves and green shoots, in order to allow a better exchange of gases. At same time, this increases possibilities for photosynthesis.

Unlike the shadow-preferring plants, heliophytes have a high light compensation point, and for this they need a higher illumination intensity for effective adoption of carbon dioxide.

However, they have a higher basal metabolism comparing  to the other leaves.

See also
Xerophyte
Thermophyte
Hydrophyte
Halophyte

References

Plants by adaptation